Zeus, in comics, may refer to:

 Zeus (Marvel Comics)
 Zeus (DC Comics)

See also
 Zeus (disambiguation)